Flamenco: Fire and Grace is the first flamenco collection from Narada Productions featuring some of flamenco's most prominent performers showcasing both instrumental and vocal.  Its liner notes contains a romantic description of flamenco by Brook Zen and brief biographies of each performer as they appear in sequence.

Track listing
Morí Soñando - Miguel de la Bastide – 4:53
Callejón de las Canteras - Tomatito – 4:54
Crisol - Enrique Morente – 4:42
Buleriando - Moraito – 4:29
Agüita Clara - Rafael Riqueni – 2:48
A mi hijo Jonatán - El Viejín – 5:43
Viajero - Miguel de la Bastide – 5:27
Chicuelina - Rafael Riqueni – 3:18
Voz de Referencia - Diego Carrasco – 2:48
Caminillo Viejo - Tomatito – 4:16
Tangos de la plaza - Enrique Morente – 3:19
Into the Dark - Jesse Cook – 4:17

Musicians

 Miguel de la Bastide - guitar
 Tomatito - guitar
 Enrique Morente - vocal
 Moraito - guitar
 Rafael Riqueni - guitar
 El Viejín - guitar
 Diego Carrasco - vocal
 Jesse Cook - guitar

References

External links 
 Flamenco: Fire and Grace from Narada.com
 El Viejín
 Diego Carrasco (español)

1996 compilation albums
Dance music compilation albums